Yu Hongqiu (born October 1960) is a Chinese politician, serving since 2018 as Deputy Communist Party Secretary of Henan province. She served in her early career at the All China Federation of Trade Unions. In 2016, she became discipline group leader at the Organization Department of the Chinese Communist Party.

Career
Yu is considered native to Laizhou, Shandong province. A graduate of Jilin University, she has a bachelor's in political economics and a master's degree in Economics. After graduating from university, she was an instructor at the China Gongyun School. She then joined the Communist Youth League at the All China Federation of Trade Unions. In July 1990, she became a party functionary at the national leadership of the China Petrochemical Trade Union, where she rose steadily through the ranks. After 2000, she began overseeing development and business expansion, then asset supervision.

In October 2010, Yu was dispatched to Guizhou, to serve as deputy party chief of Guiyang, the provincial capital. In February 2011, she was named party chief of Zunyi city. In April 2012, she entered the Guizhou provincial party standing committee, then in July was named head of the provincial propaganda department. In October 2013, she became a secretary of the national secretariat of the All-China Women's Federation.

In March 2015, Yu was named disciplinary group of the Organization Department of the Chinese Communist Party. In July 2018, Yu was named deputy party chief of Henan and head of the provincial political and legal affairs commission.

References

Jilin University alumni
Chinese women in politics
1960 births
Living people
Politicians from Yantai
Political office-holders in Guizhou
People's Republic of China politicians from Shandong
Political office-holders in Henan
All-China Women's Federation people